Nadine Ijewere (born c. 1992) is a London-born photographer of Nigerian-Jamaican parentage.  She works in the fields of fashion and portraiture,  and is known for celebrating the diversity of her models, many of whom do not conform to the standard fashion industry stereotypes.

Education

Ijewere  initially studied science and maths at A-level, using photography as a creative break from what she thought of as those more 'serious' subjects. Falling in love with photography, she decided to enroll to study it at the London College of Fashion, and it was during her time there that she started to become more concerned about some of the unsettling undertones in fashion imagery, particularly the stereotypes used in the portrayal of non-Western cultures. During her final year she started casting mixed-race models who fell outside the industry norm - something that has become central to her work.

Career

After graduating, Ijewere shunned the conventional career path of starting as a photographer's assistant, as she felt it important to   have the freedom to shoot in ways that would protect her own vision. Instead, she worked for an interior design company, maintaining her photographic passion by spending almost every spare moment and weekend photographing her mixed-raced friends.  By posting her early work on social media, she gradually built up her reputation, leading to professional commissions.

Ijewere has worked with a large number of companies with fashion interests, including Dazed, i-D, Stella McCartney, Nike and Gap. In 2017 her work featured at Unseen and Lagos Photo Festival. More recently she has worked for Dior, Hermes, Nina Ricci and Valentino.

At age 26, Ijewere became the first woman of colour to shoot a cover for Vogue, anywhere in the world. Her January 2019 cover for the UK edition featured images of Dua Lipa, Binx Walton, and Letitia Wright on the Kentish coast. Asked for her thoughts on the Vogue commission, she said, "I feel like in doing this I'm proving to younger girls from a similar background that it's achievable. It also feels like part of a broader shift within our culture to include far more diversity, both behind the camera and in front of it. As a girl, I never identified with anyone in the pages of magazines. Now, we're sending a message that everyone is welcome in fashion."

Ijewere does most of her model casting personally, often choosing models who do not conform to conventional industry standards.  She notes, "I especially like to photograph those from ethnicities that are under-represented. London is such a diverse place and I feel that needs to be reflected within the fashion world." She has stated that her work is "all about the celebration of diversity without creating a representation – particularly for women, as we are the ones who are more exposed to beauty ideals and to not being comfortable in who we are".

Ijewere's first book is a monograph titled Our Own Selves (2021).

References

Fashion photographers
British portrait photographers
Photographers from London
1990s births
Living people
British women photographers
English people of Nigerian descent
English people of Jamaican descent